The Timuquana Bridge was a proposed bridge over the St. Johns River in Jacksonville, Florida that was never built. The bridge was planned to connect with State Road 134 (103rd Street/Timuquana Road) on the west shore of the St. Johns with State Road 202 (Butler Boulevard) on the east shore.

The Timuquana was proposed because there is no other bridge crossing the eight-mile stretch of the St. Johns River between the Buckman Bridge and the Fuller Warren Bridge, and residents of the Westside wanting to go to the Southside need to travel many miles out of their way to cross the river. However, construction of the Timuquana would require the destruction of a great many houses on both sides of the river, including homes in some very exclusive neighborhoods along the west bank of the St. Johns. Accordingly, there was little to no political support for the idea from the start.

Bridges in Jacksonville, Florida
Cancelled bridge projects in the United States
Road bridges in Florida
Bridges over the St. Johns River